First Aid was a three-part British television series which aired in 1937 on the BBC. It consisted of advice on what to do in case of accidents. The episodes included Accidents in the Home, Accidents on the Road, and Accidents in Sports. The series aired in a 15-minute time-slot.

References

External links
First Aid on IMDb

1930s British television series
1937 British television series debuts
1937 British television series endings
Lost BBC episodes
British documentary television series
BBC Television shows
Black-and-white British television shows